The Women's 100 metre freestyle S9 event at the 2010 Commonwealth Games took place on 7 October 2010, at the SPM Swimming Pool Complex, Delhi. 
Natalie du Toit of South Africa created a Games Record for this event with a time of 1:02.85.

Records

Heats

Heat 1

Heat 2

Finals

References

Aquatics at the 2010 Commonwealth Games
2010 in women's swimming